José Ferrer (born 16 June 1996) is a Puerto Rican professional football player who plays for the Puerto Rican national team.

He debuted internationally on 24 March 2019 in a match against Grenada in a 0–2 defeat in the CONCACAF Nations League qualifying rounds, securing their position in League C.

In 15 October 2019, Ferrer scored his first goal for Puerto Rico in match against Anguilla in a 2–3 victory in the CONCACAF Nations League.

References

External links
 
 

1996 births
Living people
Puerto Rican footballers
Puerto Rico international footballers
Association football midfielders